Bill Bradley (born 1943) is an American retired politician and NBA basketball player.

Bill Bradley may also refer to:

Bill Bradley (basketball, born 1941) (1941–2002), American Basketball Association player
Bill Bradley (American football) (born 1947), American football player
Bill Bradley (baseball) (1878–1954), American baseball player
Bill Bradley (cricketer) (1875–1944), English cricketer
Bill Bradley (cyclist) (1933–1997), English cyclist
Bill Bradley (1913–1992), member of the Oklahoma House of Representatives also known as W. D. Bradley

See also 
William Bradley (disambiguation)